Dal Molin may refer to:

People
 Giuseppe Dal Molin, Italian curler
 Paolo Dal Molin (b. 1987), Italian athlete
 Tommaso Dal Molin (1902–1930), Italian aviator

Other
 Stadio Tommaso Dal Molin, a stadium in Arzignano, Italy
 Vicenza Airport, officially L'Aeroporto di Vicenza "Tommaso Dal Molin", a former airport in Vicenza, Italy